The Pentland Hills are a range of hills southwest of Edinburgh, Scotland.

Etymology
The name is first recorded for the farm of Pentland ( 1050, 1200) and probably derives from Brythonic pen llan, head or top end of the church or enclosure. In the late 15th to mid-16th centuries, land transfers refer to Pentlandmure and Pentland – documents that also list adjacent parcels of land with such still-recognisable names as Loganehous, Hilend, Boghall and Mortounhall. 'Muir', in Pentlandmure, describes common grazings where the farm's livestock would be pastured in summer; and gradually the name was linked more specifically with the slopes of the nearby hills (perhaps Allermuir, Woodhouselee or Castlelaw). The name is completely unrelated to the name of the Pentland Firth in the north of Scotland.

Timothy Pont mapped the area in the 1590s, and his work appeared in the maps of the Dutch cartographers Hondius (1630s) and Joan Blaeu (1654). Interestingly, Blaeu gives the name in two forms, in two different locations: Pentland Hill (roughly in the area of Castlelaw); and Penth-landt hill (further south and clearly intended as a name for the wider range).

Geology 
The southern and western parts of the Pentland Hills are formed from sandstones together with some conglomerates, all of Devonian age and assigned to the Old Red Sandstone. Within the sedimentary sequence are extrusive igneous rocks, principally of basaltic and andesitic composition. The sedimentary rocks are also intruded by dykes of porphyrite.

The oldest rocks are a sequence of Silurian mudstones, siltstones and sandstones collected together as the North Esk Group.  From oldest to youngest they comprise the Llandovery age Reservoir Formation (named for North Esk Reservoir where these rocks are to be found), the Deerhope Formation, the Cock Rig Formation and the Wether Law Linn Formation overlain by the Wenlockian age Henshaw Formation. These are in turn unconformably overlain by the late Silurian to early Devonian age sandstones and conglomerates of the Greywacke Conglomerate and Swanshaw Sandstone formations.  A further unconformity separates these from the overlying Pentland Hills Volcanic Formation though all three formations are collected together within the Lanark Group. The Volcanic Formation forms such summits as East and West Kip.

The southeastern edge of the range is defined by the Pentland Fault with a substantial downthrow to the southeast. Running NE-SW through the middle of the range is the Cairnmuir Fault which downthrows to the northwest. West Cairn Hill and East Cairn Hill are formed by the sandstones of the Kinnesswood Formation which reach as far north as Hare Hill (though also underlie much of the southeastern part of Edinburgh) and which terminate to the southeast at the Cairnmuir Fault. The Kinnesswood sandstones together with rocks of the Ballaggan Formation, which form the lower ground immediately northwest of the Pentlands, constitute the early Carboniferous age Inverclyde Group.

Black Hill stands out as being an intrusion of microgranite or felsite, as in part is nearby Harbour Hill. South Black Hill on the other hand, together with Scald Hill and Carnethy hill are formed from various lithologies of the Pentland Hills Volcanic Formation, as too are Allermuir, Caerketton and Castlelaw hills. The Volcanic Formation gives rise to generally steeper and craggier hillsides as these rocks are more resistant to erosion than the sedimentary rocks.

Much of the lower ground is covered by glacial till from the last ice age. Glacial meltwater channels are identified in places as at Deer Hope and the deep cleft of Green Cleugh between Hare Hill and Black Hill.

List of peaks 
The peaks include:
 Scald Law (579 m)
 Carnethy Hill (573 m)
 East Cairn Hill (567 m)
 South Black Hill (563 m)
 West Cairn Hill (562 m)
 West Kip (551 m)
 Byrehope Mount (536 m)
 Mount Maw (535 m)
 East Kip (534 m)
 Turnhouse Hill (506 m) (1660 ft)
 Black Hill (501 m)
 Allermuir Hill (493 m)
 Castlelaw Hill (488 m)
 Caerketton Hill (478 m)

The hills span a number of council regions: from the City of Edinburgh and Midlothian in the north, south-west through West Lothian to the Scottish Borders and South Lanarkshire.

Use

The Pentland Hills Regional Park was designated in 1986. It covers an area of 90 km² (35 sq mi) at the northern end of the hills. The park, together with the rest of the hills, is used for a variety of recreational activities including hillwalking, mountain biking, horse riding, golf, and skiing at the artificial ski slope at the Midlothian Snowsports Centre.

Today most of the land is upland pasture, along with a few forestry plantations. The Ministry of Defence have a rifle range at Castlelaw. A number of rivers rise in the hills, including the Water of Leith and the North Esk, and there are several reservoirs, including Threipmuir, Harlaw, Clubbiedean, Torduff, Glencorse and Loganlea.

In the southern part of the hills is Little Sparta, the garden of the late artist and poet Ian Hamilton Finlay.

Settlements in or near the Pentlands include:
 Edinburgh suburbs - Balerno (with Malleny Mills), Juniper Green, Colinton, Currie, Oxgangs, Fairmilehead, Swanston
 Midlothian - Glencorse, Hillend, Nine Mile Burn, Eight Mile Burn, Penicuik, Silverburn
 West Lothian - Kirknewton. Livingston is also nearby.
 Scottish Borders (traditional Peeblesshire) - Carlops, West Linton
 South Lanarkshire - Biggar, Auchengray, Carnwath, Dolphinton, Dunsyre, Garvald, Tarbrax

History

There is evidence of prehistoric settlement in the area, e.g. the hillfort and souterrain at Castle Law, and another at Caerketton. The hills were most likely settled, farmed and defended in the pre-Roman and Roman era by the local Celtic people known to the Romans as the Votadini.

About 20 m (66 ft) into Glencorse Reservoir lie the submerged ruins of the chapel of St Katherine's in the Hope. The founding of the chapel is connected with the story of a mediaeval royal deer hunt.  According to the story, King Robert the Bruce staked the Pentland Estate against the life of Sir William St Clair, with the outcome of the hunt of a white deer by the knight and his two hounds, 'Help' and 'Hold', being the deciding factor. The dogs managed to bring down the deer, and in gratitude, and to mark the spot, Sir William had a chapel built in the glen.

The hills were the scene of an incident in 1666 following the Restoration of King Charles II when an outbreak of armed rebellion amongst Covenanters led to a small force of badly armed conventiclers being defeated at the battle of Rullion Green. Afterwards the whole episode was (incorrectly) named the Pentland Rising. The incident is commemorated by the "Covenanter's Grave", a cairn after which one of the drove roads across the hills is known (OS Grid Reference NT078521).

In literature
In Greyfriars Bobby, Bobby comes from (and later revisits) the Pentland Hills, whilst in  Mary Shelley's novel Frankenstein, Frankenstein's friend Henri Clerval is said to have been filled with 'cheerfulness and admiration' when he visited the Pentland Hills while heading further north (Chapter 19).

Gallery

See also
List of places in the Scottish Borders
List of places in South Lanarkshire
List of places in Edinburgh
List of places in Midlothian
List of places in West Lothian

References

External links

 Pentland Hills Regional Park
 Friends of the Pentlands
 Pentland Hills Webcam
   Carnethy 5 Hill Race in the Pentland Hills Virtual Tour

Lothian
Hills of Edinburgh
Hills of the Scottish Midland Valley
Volcanism of Scotland
Devonian volcanism
Parks in Scotland
Regional parks in Scotland
Protected areas of West Lothian
Landforms of West Lothian
Protected areas of South Lanarkshire
Landforms of South Lanarkshire
Protected areas of Midlothian
Mountains and hills of Midlothian
Mountain ranges of Scotland
Mountains and hills of the Scottish Borders